Jim Mullen (born 26 November 1945) is a Scottish, Glasgow-born jazz guitarist with a distinctive style, like Wes Montgomery before him, picking with the thumb rather than a plectrum.

Biography
Jim Mullen was guitarist with Pete Brown & Piblokto! for two albums in 1970. He then played with Brian Auger's Oblivion Express, appearing on the band's first three albums together with future Average White Band drummer Robbie McIntosh. Mullen then joined Kokomo and later toured with the Average White Band.

It was while both musicians were touring the United States with AWB in the mid-1970s that Mullen met tenor saxophone player Dick Morrissey, and throughout the 1980s, he found critical notice as joint leader of the British jazz funk band Morrissey–Mullen. Record producer Richard Niles, who produced the band's sixth album, It's About Time, later produced three solo albums for Mullen.

Mullen has also played and recorded with, among others, Mose Allison, Hamish Stuart, Joanna Eden, Tam White, Claire Martin, Mike Carr, Jimmy Witherspoon, Dave O'Higgins and Georgie Fame, Sinan Alimanović, David Tughan, Jimmy Smith, Terry Callier and Frank Holder. Mullen has recorded as part of The AllStars, a collective of session musicians on their Paul McCartney-produced album All About the Music, alongside special guests Jocelyn Brown, Hamish Stuart and Angelo Starr. In 2014, he featured prominently on the Citrus Sun album, People of Tomorrow, produced by Incognito co-founder, Jean-Paul 'Bluey' Maunick.

Mullen has won many British music awards including "Best Guitar" in the British Telecom Jazz Awards (1994, 1996 and 2000).

Discography 

As leader/co-leader
1980: Live at Ronnie Scott's - with Mike Carr and Harold Smith
1990: Into The 90's 
1993: Good Times and The Blues - with Dick Morrissey and Mike Carr
1993: Soundbites 
1997: Big Blues - with Jimmy Witherspoon
2000: Burns 
2001: We Go Back
2001: ...but beautiful - Jim Mullen–Helmut Nieberle Sextett (Bobtale Records) 
2002: jimjam - with Hamish Stuart
2003: Rule of Thumb - with Laurence Cottle
2003: Live in Glasgow - with Gary Husband, Mick Hutton and Gareth Williams
2005: Gig Bag - The Organ Trio (Jim Mullen/Mike Gorman/Matt Skelton)
2007: All About the Music - The AllStars 
2007: Smokescreen - The Jim Mullen Organ Trio featuring Stan Sulzmann 
2009: Make Believe - The Jim Mullen Organ Trio featuring Stan Sulzmann
2012: String Theory - The Jim Mullen Quartet
2014: Catch My Drift - The Jim Mullen Organ Trio

As sideman
1970: Things May Come and Things May Go but the Art School Dance Goes on Forever - Pete Brown & Piblokto! (Harvest SHVL 768)
1970: Thousands on a Raft - Pete Brown & Piblokto! (Harvest SHVL 782)
1977: Benny and Us - Average White Band
1977: The Atlantic Family Live in Montreaux 
1998: TimePeace - Terry Callier
1999: Lifetime - Terry Callier
2001: Alive - Terry Callier
2001: Cartoon Capers 
2002: The Mose Chronicles: Live in London, Vol. 2 - Mose Allison (Blue Note)
2002: He Never Mentioned Love - Claire Martin
2002: Speak Your Peace - Terry Callier
2005: Builders' Brew - David Tughan (OT Records)
2014: People of Tomorrow - Citrus Sun (Dome Records)
2019: One Fine Day - Chris Rea (Rhino Entertainment)

References

External links
 Mullen's myspace page

1945 births
Living people
Scottish jazz guitarists
Musicians from Glasgow
Morrissey–Mullen members